Pandori is a village and union council of Jhelum District in the Punjab Province of Pakistan. It is part of Dina Tehsil, and is located at 33°6'0N 73°37'0E with an altitude of 271 metres (892 feet).

References

Union councils of Jhelum District
Populated places in Jhelum District